Little Wyrley is an English hamlet in the county of Staffordshire, that forms part of Norton Canes civil parish and the Cannock Chase district. In 1870-72 it had a population of 61 as recorded in the Imperial Gazetteer of England and Wales.

It borders the village of Landywood to the west (the Southern area of the larger village of Great Wyrley), Norton Canes to the north, and the Walsall district of Pelsall to the east, of which it shares the postcode district of WS3.

Little Wyrley Hall is currently owned by the Wallace family, who also own much of the land in Little Wyrley. Apart from the Hall, there is also a Tythe Barn and a number of apartments.

Transport

Road 
There are a few country lanes through Little Wyrley, the main one being Wyrley Lane, that give access to main, busier roads, including the A34 that runs through Great Wyrley, the A5, and the B4154 road that leads to Pelsall going south. The house numbers do not go sequentially and there are large gaps of land between them. School Lane was closed to traffic some years ago.

Other 
There are no other forms of transport through Little Wyrley and it is not on any bus routes.

References 

Hamlets in Staffordshire
Cannock Chase District